Dungeons & Dragons is an action-adventure fantasy film series based on the role-playing game of the same name  currently owned by Wizards of the Coast. The original trilogy consisted of a theatrical film, a made-for-TV second installment, and a direct-to-video third installment.

A reboot is in the works from Paramount Pictures scheduled for release on March 31, 2023.

Films

Original trilogy

Dungeons & Dragons (2000) 

The Empire of Izmer is a divided land. An elite group of sorcerers, known as "The Mages", rule the land while the commoners are left defenseless. The Empress of Izmer, Savina, fights for equality and prosperity amongst all citizens, but the wicked and powerful Mage Profion plots to overtake her throne. As he plots to rule the Empire by nefarious means, the Empress seeks the Rod of Savrille, which has the power to control the Red Dragons. She hires two petty thieves, Ridley and Snails, who become her key to aligning with the dragonkeeper. Together with a mage apprentice named Marina, a combative Dwarf named Elwood, and the Empire's personal expert tracker - an Elf named Norda- they must outpace Profion's chief henchman Damodar to find the Rod of Savrille; the artifact that has the power to set their Kingdom free.

Dungeons & Dragons: Wrath of the Dragon God (2005) 

When the evil sorcerer Damodar succeeds in stealing the mystic elemental black orb, he declares a sinister vengeance against the kingdom of Ismir. A decorated warrior of the Empire, named Berek, and Melora, an unseasoned sorceress join forces with four heroes - representing Intelligence, Wisdom, Honor and Strength - to thwart the evil Mage and his growing army. Together they must reach the vault that holds the orb, assembling their own army, and defeat Damadar before he awakens the dormant black dragon whose purpose would destroy the entire kingdom.

It is the second instalment in the series, it serves as a stand-alone sequel to Dungeons & Dragons (2000). The only returning actor is Bruce Payne, reprising his role as Damodar. The film premiered at the Sci-Fi Channel on October 10, 2005. It was released in theaters in Europe as well as some parts of North America and Latin America, and released on DVD on February 7, 2006.

Dungeons & Dragons 3: The Book of Vile Darkness (2012) 

It is the third installment in the series. Shot in Bulgaria in 2011, it was released direct-to-DVD in the United Kingdom on 9 August 2012.

Reboot

Dungeons & Dragons: Honor Among Thieves (2023) 

A reboot has dealt with years of delays with legal disputes over filming rights between Hasbro, Universal Pictures, and Warner Bros. Pictures. In 2017, Paramount Pictures announced that they were distributing a Dungeons & Dragons film set for release in 2021. In July 2019, Jonathan Goldstein and John Francis Daley were in talks to direct. By January 2020, the two had adapted a script by David Leslie Johnson-McGoldrick and Michael Gilio for the film. In December 2020, it was announced Chris Pine was cast to star in the film. In early 2021, Hugh Grant was cast as Forge Fletcher, with Michelle Rodriguez, Regé-Jean Page, Justice Smith, Sophia Lillis, Chloe Coleman, Jason Wong and Daisy Head joining the cast. Filming began in April 2021 in Iceland and concluded August 19, 2021, with principal photography in Northern Ireland. The film is scheduled to be released March 31, 2023 after being delayed from various dates in 2021 and 2022.

Untitled spin-off television series 
In February 2022, a spin-off television series was announced to be in development. A part of a "multi-pronged approach" for television projects, the show is described as the "flagship" and "cornerstone" live-action series, of the multiple projects in development; while the series will "complement" the film side of the franchise. Rawson Marshall Thurber is set to serve as creator, writer, executive producer, and showrunner and the series, in addition to directing the pilot episode. Various networks and streaming companies are reportedly bidding on distribution rights. In January 2023, it was announced that Paramount+ had given the show a straight to series order and will be produced by Entertainment One and Paramount Pictures.

Additional crew details

In other media 
Wizards of the Coast released a Fast-Play Game, The Sewers of Sumdall, based on the first film. It is a DVD-ROM feature on the DVD as a printable PDF file.

References

External links 
 
 
 
 

American film series
Dungeons & Dragons films
Films based on Hasbro toys
Films based on role-playing games
High fantasy films